"The Call of the Wild" is a song co-written and recorded by American country music artist Aaron Tippin.  It was released in October 1993 as the second single from the album Call of the Wild.  The song reached #17 on the Billboard Hot Country Singles & Tracks chart.  Tippin wrote the song with Buddy Brock and Michael P. Heeney.

Chart performance

References

1994 singles
1993 songs
Aaron Tippin songs
Songs written by Buddy Brock
Songs written by Michael P. Heeney
Songs written by Aaron Tippin
Song recordings produced by Scott Hendricks
RCA Records singles